Fatal Frame, titled  in Japan and Project Zero in Europe and Australia, is a Japanese survival horror video game series created, published and developed by Koei Tecmo (originally Tecmo). Debuting in 2001 with the first entry in the series for the PlayStation 2, the series consists of five main entries. The series is set in 1980s Japan, with each entry focusing on a location beset by hostile supernatural events. In each scenario, the characters involved in the present investigation use Camera Obscura, objects created by Dr. Kunihiko Asou that can capture and pacify spirits. The series draws on staple elements of Japanese horror, and is noted for its frequent use of female protagonists.

The series was conceived by Makoto Shibata and Keisuke Kikuchi. After being introduced to the PlayStation 2 hardware and after the success of the Silent Hill series, the pair decided to develop a horror series inspired by Shibata's own spiritual experiences and popular Japanese horror films of the time. Their main goal was to make the most frightening game experience possible. Later installments have refined the gameplay mechanics while also adding more complex narrative elements.

The series has received critical acclaim, being ranked alongside other horror series including the Resident Evil and Silent Hill series, and individual games have been ranked among the best survival horror games in existence. While the sales of individual games have never been high, the series as a whole has sold over one million copies worldwide as of April 2014. Multiple Japanese media adaptations have been made, including manga and a 2014 live-action feature film.

Titles
As of 2014, the series consists of five mainline video games, not counting remakes, re-releases and spin-offs. Fatal Frame was originally only released in Japan. While a European release was planned, it was eventually cancelled, and no North American release was planned. A fan translation of the fourth game was released in 2010, which enabled the game to be played on any Wii system. Outside their international releases, the Fatal Frame games are not numbered. This was due to the series' creators considering each entry to be a standalone game, with minimal connections to previous titles. Since the fourth game, new Fatal Frame titles have been funded and co-developed by Nintendo, resulting in new series titles since the fourth game originally only appearing on Nintendo consoles. Koei Tecmo would later purchase Nintendo's publishing rights for multi platform rereleases of Fatal Frame: Mask of the Lunar Eclipse and Fatal Frame: Maiden of Black Water.

Video games

Main series

The titular first entry in the series was released on the PlayStation 2 in 2001 in Japan and 2002 in North America and Europe and on the Xbox in 2002 in North America and 2003 in Europe. The second game, Fatal Frame II: Crimson Butterfly, was released again for PlayStation 2 in 2003 in Japan and North America, and 2004 in Europe as well as for Xbox in 2004 in North America and in 2005 in Europe. Fatal Frame III: The Tormented likewise released for the PlayStation 2 in 2005 for Japan and North America, and 2006 in Europe. In 2008, Fatal Frame: Mask of the Lunar Eclipse released in Japan for the Wii, and has not been released overseas. The fifth title, Fatal Frame: Maiden of Black Water, was released for the Wii U in 2014 in Japan and 2015 in North America, Europe and Australia. During Nintendo's E3 2021 Nintendo Direct, it was announced that a remaster of Fatal Frame: Maiden of Black Water will be available later in 2021. The new version was released on the Nintendo Switch, PlayStation 4, PlayStation 5, Xbox One, Xbox Series X/S, and Microsoft Windows.

Spin-off and remake
The first two titles have received expanded re-releases. An expanded port of the original game was released for the Xbox in 2002 in Japan and 2003 in Western territories. It featured additional story elements, gameplay refinements and a new difficulty setting. For Crimson Butterfly, a "Director's Cut" for the Xbox was released in 2004 in Japan and North America, and 2005 in Europe. A new expanded remake for the Wii was released in Japan and Europe in 2012.

A mobile title, Real Zero, was released in 2004 for FOMA and DoCoMo mobile devices. The game involves users taking pictures of their environments and superimposing ghost images somewhere in the frame. Seventy different ghosts were available to collect, with each new ghost triggering the sending of an email to provide clues for finding the next ghost or other messages. The game's service was terminated in 2011. A spin-off for the Nintendo 3DS, Spirit Camera, was released in all regions in 2012. The story follows a girl named Maya, who is trapped in a haunted house controlled by a mysterious woman in black, and seeks to escape the woman's control.

Pachinko 
In May 2020, a pachislot machine simply titled Pachislot Zero was announced by Yamasa Group. Set to be released in Japan for pachinko parlors in July 2020, the game recreates scenes from the first game in the series with updated graphics, along with additions like new characters and a third ending.

Related media
To commemorate the release of Crimson Butterfly, a special interactive attraction titled Zero4D opened in 2004. It featured movie scenes designed by the same team behind the CGI movies for Crimson Butterfly. A manga based on the series written by Shin Kibayashi, Fatal Frame: Shadow Priestess, was released in both Japanese and English through DeNA's website in July 2014. A Japanese live-action movie directed by Mari Asato for Kadokawa Pictures was released in cinemas in 2014. The novel it was based on, Fatal Frame: A Curse Affecting Only Girls by Eiji Ohtsuka, was released a few months prior to the movie.

A Hollywood film adaptation of the first game was announced in 2003. Robert Fyvolent and Mark R. Brinker were hired as the project's writers, and John Rogers was hired as its producer. The title was being produced by DreamWorks. Later that year, Steven Spielberg was helping Rogers to polish the game's script, and that sessions to find a director and cast the movie would follow. In 2014 alongside the formal announcement of Maiden of Black Water, it was confirmed that the Hollywood film was still planned. Now produced by Samuel Hadida, it was set to begin production after the completion and release of the game. Christophe Gans said in an interview that the movie will take place in Japan in an attempt to capture its Japanese haunted house setting.

Common elements

Series gameplay

The gameplay has remained consistent through the series' lifetime. Each environment is filled with ghosts, with separate games having different attack behaviors for them. While navigating these environments, the main character's only means of defense is the Camera Obscura, which can be used to damage ghosts, capturing them on film and pacifying them. When using the camera, the view switches from a third-person to a first-person perspective. The camera locks onto a ghost, with the amount of damage dealt depending on how much of a focus the Camera Obscura has on the ghost, but ghosts fade in and out of existence, making focusing more challenging. Shots of varying closeness and angles also affect how much damage the ghost takes. The most damaging is a "fatal frame", which hits a ghost weak spot. A ghost's captured spirit energy is converted into points, which can be used to buy items to upgrade the Camera Obscura and obtain more powerful film.

In addition to hostile ghosts, there are passive ghosts encountered in parts of the environment: if they are not caught on film at once, they vanish from the rest of the game. Ghosts captured on film are added to a list, which reveals a ghost's past. For the first three games, navigation is done using semi-fixed third-person view of environments, with characters moving at a slow pace through them. For Mask of the Lunar Eclipse and later entries, the camera perspective was altered to a third-person over-the-shoulder view and character movement was increased a little to speed up gameplay. The ability to either dodge or break free from a ghost's grip was added in Maiden of Black Water.

Setting
The Fatal Frame / Project Zero series is set in the 1980s, before mobile phones were commonly used in Japan. Aside from a few recurring characters, each game has a self-contained story focusing on a different supernatural threat. The main unifying factor is navigating through haunted locations struck by a supernatural catastrophe, with a recurring setting being abandoned Japanese mansions. Recurring characters include Dr. Kunihiko Asou, an occultist who lived in the 1800s and created objects such as the Camera Obscura; and Miku Hinasaki, the protagonist of Fatal Frame and one of three protagonists in The Tormented, who also appears in Maiden of Black Water as one of the main characters' missing mother. A second recurring feature is the exclusive or frequent use of female characters in the leading role. This was explained as being due to the overall tone of the series: since traditional violence was not used, it was better to use a female character to convey this. It was also felt that women were more spiritually aware than men. Another recurring concept is a pseudo-physical location bridging the physical and spiritual worlds, inspired by a tanka written by Japanese poet Taeko Kuzuhara: these were represented by the Hellish Abyss in Crimson Butterfly and the lake in Maiden of Black Water.

The first chronological entry in the series, Mask of the Lunar Eclipse, takes place in 1980. The story revolves around three girls who travel back to the fictional Rougetsu Island to recover memories of being kidnapped while they lived there ten years before. On the island, they must investigate the secrets behind a local ritual dance and an ancient mask related to the ritual. Fatal Frame is set six years after Mask of the Lunar Eclipse, with Crimson Butterfly being set two years after that. The Tormented is set two months after the second game's events. Maiden of Black Water is set at an unspecified date after the third game. It takes place around the fictional Mount Hikami, a site infamous for suicides and rituals associated with local bodies of water. The main protagonists are each drawn to the mountain intent on rescuing someone, confronting hostile ghosts along the way.

History and development
The concept for Fatal Frame / Project Zero first occurred by Makoto Shibata. The idea occurred after the development of Tecmo's Deception: Invitation to Darkness. Inspired by his own experiences of supernatural events, and heartened by the success of the Silent Hill series, Shibata and Keisuke Kikuchi set to work on creating the basics for the game. Shibata was in charge of the majority of game and scenario development, while Kikuchi was in charge of general oversight. When creating the atmosphere, the team watched both high and low-budget Japanese horror films, and war films. One of their goals was to make the game as scary as possible. The Camera Obscura was not in the initial discussions between Shibata and Kikuchi, with the original idea being that ghosts would be avoided and repelled by light. Ultimately, they decided to have a type of offensive power, which resulted in the Camera's creation. Kikuchi was initially opposed to the idea, but saw that it fitted very well into the game's context as development progressed. The first game was marketed in the west as being based on a true story, and while this was not accurate, the story of Fatal Frame was inspired by both real locations noted for apparent haunting and local ghost-related folklore.

For Crimson Butterfly, the team toned down the frightening aspects so players would be willing to complete a playthrough, alongside creating a stronger story. The story was inspired by a dream Shibata had, with the interpretive nature of the game's events being inspired by his feelings about the dream. For The Tormented, they decided to focus on horror elements emerging out of everyday life, focusing on the effects of dreams upon reality. Mask of the Lunar Eclipse was co-produced by Koei Tecmo, Nintendo and Grasshopper Manufacture, with Grasshopper Manufacture's Goichi Suda acting as a co-director with Shibata. The gameplay was constructed around the Wii hardware, with the main concept being for players to feel the fear physically. The entire concept occurred by Kikuchi when he saw the specifications for the Wii. Maiden of Black Water originated when Kikuchi saw the Wii U hardware, and was co-produced by Koei Tecmo and Nintendo. As they wanted to bring more people into the series, they included a stronger narrative and new gameplay elements to make the experience easier for newcomers.

Since Crimson Butterfly, theme songs have been created for each title, primarily performed by Japanese singer Tsuki Amano. The development team wanted an image song for Crimson Butterfly, and Shibata found the then-newly debuted Amano in the Japanese independent community. Amano created the song using documents on the game's story, themes and setting. Amano returned multiple times to create theme songs for The Tormented, Mask of the Lunar Eclipse, and a new theme song for the Wii remake of Crimson Butterfly. She again returned for Maiden of Black Water, and a second new singer AnJu contributed a second theme song to the title.

Reception

In Japan, each title in the Fatal Frame / Project Zero series has seen modest success: the first game's lifetime sales are the lowest in the series, while Mask of the Lunar Eclipse currently stands as the best-selling title in the series to date. Since its debut in 2001, the Fatal Frame series has sold 1.3 million copies worldwide.

Multiple video game journalists have singled out the series. IGN's Clara Barraza, in an article on the evolution of the survival horror genre, said that the first game "broke away from the use of weapons like guns and planks of wood to switch it up and try something completely different", praising the use of the Camera Obscura in evoking a sense of fear and calling the game "[a] unique spin on the genre". In a different article for IGN on the history of survival horror, editor Travis Fahs stated that the series gave a much-needed boost to the genre during a period of decline in the early 2000s, highlighting the Japanese horror aesthetic as a selling point that attracted players in tandem with the popularity of The Ring. As part of an interview with the series' creators in 2006, GameSpy writer Christian Nutt referred to it as one of the three best-known horror video game series alongside Resident Evil and Silent Hill. Similarly, as part of a review of Maiden of Black Water, Dennis Scimeca of The Daily Dot ranked the Fatal Frame series alongside Resident Evil and Silent Hill. In an article on the series, Kotaku writer Richard Eisenbeis said that Fatal Frame succeeded in drawing his attention when most other horror games did not, generally praising the settings and the "master stroke" of the Camera Obscura in gameplay. In an interview, F.E.A.R. 2: Project Origin art leader Dave Matthews stated that the gameplay of F.E.A.R. 2 was influenced by the Fatal Frame series. In multiple articles, Crimson Butterfly has been singled out by video game publications and industry developers as one of the scariest games of the horror genre in general.

Notes

References

 
Video games about ghosts
Koei Tecmo franchises
Photography games
Psychological horror games
Tecmo games
Koei Tecmo games
Video game franchises
Video game franchises introduced in 2001
Video games featuring female protagonists
Video games set in Japan
Fiction about photography